Byron "Bam" Morris (born January 13, 1972) is a former American football running back who played for the Pittsburgh Steelers, Chicago Bears, Baltimore Ravens, and the Kansas City Chiefs.

Early life
Morris attended Texas Tech University where he won the 1993 Doak Walker Award as the top running back in college football. Among other accomplishments while playing for the Red Raiders, Morris was ranked second in the nation in rushing yards per game in 1993. He was drafted by the Pittsburgh Steelers with the 91st overall pick in the 1994 NFL Draft (3rd round). His older brother Ron Morris played for the Chicago Bears and collegiately at Southern Methodist University (SMU). Their older brother J.C. Morris played college football at Texas Christian University (TCU).

Professional career
During his NFL career, he recorded 3,809 yards on 974 attempts and scored 35 touchdowns during 75 games. He also caught 103 passes for 790 yards and one touchdown. He was the leading rusher for the Steelers in their Super Bowl XXX loss to the Cowboys, gaining 73 yards on 19 carries.

Off-field issues
Morris has become more well known for his off-field legal troubles than his football prowess. On June 27, 1996, Morris pleaded guilty to felony possession of marijuana in a plea bargain deal in front of a Rockwall County, Texas judge. Police testified that they found 6 pounds of marijuana during a traffic stop. He was fined $7,000 and sentenced to 200 hours of community service and six years' probation.

He was cut by the Steelers after the guilty plea and signed as a free agent with the Baltimore Ravens. After two seasons, both marked with suspensions concerning the NFL's substance abuse policy, Morris was released. He signed with the Chicago Bears the following year, but was cut after playing in only two regular season games. He then signed with the Kansas City Chiefs.

Morris pleaded guilty in August 2001 to two counts of federal drug trafficking and was sentenced to 30 months in prison. As part of the plea bargain, Morris admitted to distributing more than 100 kilograms of marijuana in the Kansas City area between 1998 and 2000.

On September 10, 2001, Morris was convicted of violating his parole stemming from his 1996 plea bargain and sentenced to 10 years in a Texas prison. He was released early on February 29, 2004.

He played arena football with the Katy Copperheads in 2006.

See also
 List of NCAA major college football yearly scoring leaders

References

1972 births
Living people
African-American players of American football
American football running backs
Pittsburgh Steelers players
Chicago Bears players
Kansas City Chiefs players
People from Cooper, Texas
Texas Tech Red Raiders football players
American drug traffickers
Baltimore Ravens players
American people convicted of drug offenses
American sportspeople convicted of crimes
21st-century African-American sportspeople
20th-century African-American sportspeople